Cesar Chavez Avenue (Spanish: Avenida César Chávez) is a major east–west thoroughfare in Downtown Los Angeles, the Eastside and East Los Angeles, measuring 6.19 miles (9.96 km) in length. Named in honor of union leader César Chávez, the street was formed in 1994 from Sunset Boulevard between Figueroa and Main streets, a new portion of roadway, Macy Street between Main Street and Mission Road, and Brooklyn Avenue through Boyle Heights and East Los Angeles into Monterey Park. Much of the street is double-signed with its former names.

History

In October 1993, the Los Angeles City Council and the County Board of Supervisors approved the renaming of the stretch of roadway, but agreed to delay the change until 1994 and to put up historic plaques along Brooklyn Avenue to accommodate the opposition, many of whom believed that the new name would cause people to forget the Jewish history of the area.

A street sign unveiling ceremony was held on March 31, 1994, Chávez's birthday, at the five-points intersection at Indiana Street, along the border of Boyle Heights and the unincorporated area of East Los Angeles.

Route
Part of the pre-1940 Route 66, Cesar Chavez Avenue begins as a continuation of Sunset Boulevard on the east side of Figueroa Street. It runs through Downtown Los Angeles, crosses Alameda Street and passes over the Los Angeles River, through the neighborhoods of Brooklyn Heights and Boyle Heights and the northern portion of East Los Angeles into the southern portion of Monterey Park.

The roadway becomes Riggin Street when it crosses Atlantic Boulevard in Monterey Park.

Transportation
Union Station, which provides connections to the B, D and L lines, as well as Metrolink and Amtrak.
Metro Local line 70 runs through Cesar Chavez Avenue.

Notable landmarks
Sunset Boulevard
Pueblo de Los Angeles
Olvera Street
Terminal Annex
Union Station
Evergreen Cemetery
East Los Angeles Civic Center
East Los Angeles College
Cesar Chavez Avenue Viaduct

References

Streets in Los Angeles
Sunset Boulevard (Los Angeles)
Downtown Los Angeles
Echo Park, Los Angeles